Body Brokers is a 2021 American crime thriller film written and directed by John Swab and starring Jack Kilmer, Michael Kenneth Williams, Jessica Rothe, Alice Englert, Peter Greene, Frank Grillo, and Melissa Leo.

This was Michael Kenneth Williams' last film to be released in his lifetime before his death on September 6, 2021.

The film was released in the United States on February 19, 2021, by Vertical Entertainment.

Plot
A drug addict is brought to Los Angeles for treatment, who soon learns the treatment center is not meant to help people but instead a coverup for a fraud operation enlisting addicts to recruit other addicts.

Cast
 Jack Kilmer as Utah 
 Michael Kenneth Williams as Wood
 Jessica Rothe as May
 Alice Englert as Opal 
 Peter Greene as Dr. Riner
 Frank Grillo as Vin
 Melissa Leo as Dr. White
 Thomas Dekker as Jacko 
 Sam Quartin as Tina
 Renée Willett as Penny
 Pam Dougherty as Miss Tee

Production
In July 2019, Melissa Leo, Michael Kenneth Williams, Frank Grillo, Alice Englert, and Jack Kilmer joined the cast of the film, with John Swab directing from a screenplay he wrote. In August 2019, Jessica Rothe, Owen Campbell, Thomas Dekker, Peter Greene and Sam Quartin joined the cast of the film.

Principal photography took place in August 2019 in Oklahoma.

Release
In December 2020, Vertical Entertainment acquired distribution rights to the film, and set it for a February 19, 2021, release.

Reception

On review aggregator website Rotten Tomatoes, Body Brokers holds an approval rating of 64% based on 25 reviews, with an average rating of 5.7/10. The site's critical consensus reads, "Body Brokers attempts an ambitious juggling act between genre thrills and a serious social message -- and unfortunately fumbles a little too often to really pull it off." On Metacritic, the film holds an average weighted score of 65 out of 100, based on five critics, indicating "generally favorable reviews".

References

External links
 
 

2021 films
2021 crime thriller films
American crime thriller films
Films set in Los Angeles
Films shot in Oklahoma
Vertical Entertainment films
Voltage Pictures films
Films about drugs
2020s English-language films
2020s American films